Bar aux Folies-Bergère is a one-act ballet created in 1934, with scenario and choreography by Ninette de Valois, and designs by William Chappell after Manet. The music consists of piano works by Emmanuel Chabrier, selected and arranged by Constant Lambert.

The Ballet Rambert in 1934 had a dancer, Elisabeth Schooling, who had a very similar appearance to the barmaid in Manet's Un bar aux Folies Bergère. Ashley Dukes, Marie Rambert's husband suggested there might be a ballet around the picture, also introducing can-can dancers. In fact the role was created by Pearl Argyle, but Schooling danced it subsequently. The original owner of Manet's 1882 painting was Chabrier; it now hangs in the Courtauld Institute of Art in London.

Bar aux Folies-Bergère was first performed on 15 May 1934 by Ballet Rambert at the Ballet Club at the Mercury Theatre, Notting Hill, London. The cast included Alicia Markova as the can-can dancer La Goulue, Frederick Ashton as the waiter Valentin le Désossé, Pearl Argyle as the Barmaid, with Diana Gould, Mary Skeaping, Tamara Svetlova and Mona Kimberley (Can-can dancers), William Chappell and Walter Gore (Adolphe and Gustave, habitues of the Bar), Oliver Reynolds (an old man) and Suzette Morfield (a servant). Antony Tudor was the production stage manager.

Synopsis
The scene is the Folies Bergère around 1870. The curtain opens on the barmaid looking into space then busying herself wiping off bottles and glasses. Adolphe and Gustave enter and orders drinks. A waiter, Valentin, is in love with the barmaid, whom he persuades to come from behind the counter to dance with him. When the can-can dancers appear (entering through the audience, as at the real Folies Bergère) and dance, she retreats behind the bar again. When La Goulue does her turn, Valentin becomes besotted with her, breaking the heart of the barmaid, who, after everyone has left and the cleaner starts her work, finally resumes the pose of Manet's painting.

An early review in  The Daily Telegraph praised de Valois's "intelligent and amusing" choreography, and noted the "star" dancing of Markova, the "statuesque" Gould's skills as a "comedienne", and found Ashton's performance and the whole production "deliciously gay". Cyril Beaumont commended the way in which the choreographer had made "a succession of appropriate and reasonable incidents which afforded excuse for dancing and mime. He noted Markova's "piquant and harmless" La Goulue which she did with "such artless naughtiness, and with so engaging an air, as to be irresistible", while Ashton was "brilliant ... dapper, suave, deft, lively as quicksilver".

It was the only work choreographed by de Valois for the Rambert company, was included in the repertoire when the company toured France in 1937, and was performed regularly by them until the late 1940s.

The music was chosen by Constant Lambert from the ten Pièces pittoresques of 1881 by Chabrier. Some of the movements were slightly altered by Lambert ("Mélancolie" and "Tourbillon"), or cut ("Idylle", "Scherzo-valse") and "Danse villageoise" was used as the overture.

Valois's 36-page loose-leaf notebook describing the choreography with comments by Rambert is kept in the archives of the Rambert Dance Company.

See also 
 List of ballets by title
 List of historical ballet characters

References

Ballets by Ninette de Valois
Ballets to the music of Emmanuel Chabrier
1934 ballet premieres
Ballets designed by William Chappell
Ballets premiered in London